Hamza Zakar (born 14 August 1986) is a retired Tunisian football defender.

References

1986 births
Living people
Tunisian footballers
CA Bizertin players
EGS Gafsa players
Stade Tunisien players
Stade Gabèsien players
LPS Tozeur players
JS Kairouan players
Association football midfielders
Tunisian Ligue Professionnelle 1 players